Gold's Gym International, Inc. is an American chain of international co-ed fitness centers (commonly referred to as gyms) originally started by Joe Gold in Venice Beach, California. Each gym offers a variety of cardio and strength training equipment as well as group exercise programs. Gold's Gym's headquarters have relocated to Dallas.

Corporate history 

Joe Gold opened the first Gold's Gym in August 1965, in Venice Beach, California, long before the modern day health club existed.  Featuring homemade equipment and dubbed "the Mecca of bodybuilding", it was frequented by Arnold Schwarzenegger and Dave Draper.

After Gold to Pumping Iron 
In 1970, Gold sold the gym which was failing at the time to Bud Danits, most commonly known as an antique dealer, and Dave Saxe who was a jeweler. He and Saxe were co-owners of the gym for almost two years. They realized that running the gym was not a plausible operation; they were going to close it and reopen the location as an antiques shop. They offered to sell it to Ken Sprague, a gym member who visited frequently. Sprague purchased it in late 1971; this kept the gym running. Sprague was the first owner of Gold's to actually sponsor and hold bodybuilding competitions, and his promotional skills and film industry contacts helped build the establishment's profile.

By 1975, when George Butler was going to film the docudrama Pumping Iron (1977), it was Sprague's savvy, telling Butler that he would paint the windows over to minimize back light, and let Butler mount a lighting grid to the inside ceiling that made Gold's Gym the primary location for filming Pumping Iron, which brought attention not only to the gym itself but also to bodybuilding and physique in general. After the release of the movie, and along with the 1977 Mr. America contest and Mr. America Day parade held in Santa Monica, sponsored and conceived of by Sprague, the profile of Gold's gym grew even larger. That year's Mr. America had more press requests than the 1977 Academy Awards. By 1979, when Sprague had sold Gold's Gym, it was the most famous gym in the world. Gold's Gym continues to be considered a landmark in bodybuilding culture and has achieved cult status.

Subsequent ownership, franchising, and image 
From 1979 to 1999, Gold's Gym was owned by Peter Grymkowski (a Mr. World bodybuilding champion) and his partners. After two years of ownership, they moved from the 5500-square-foot facility into a 60,000-square-foot building over a six-year period. Grymkowski's brother became the licensing director, which helped bring the Gold's Gym name from one location to over 534 throughout the U.S. and the world in 1999, when it was sold to private equity firm Brockway Moran & Partners. Another private equity firm, TRT Holdings, bought Gold's Gym in 2004. German fitness company RSG Group acquired Gold's in August 2020.

Gold's Gym was one of the first companies in the health and fitness industry to franchise, starting in 1980. The company licenses its name to products such as fitness equipment and clothing. The original Gold's Gym logo, a bald weightlifter holding a barbell, was designed in 1973 by professional wrestler Ric Drasin, who was Schwarzenegger's training partner for four years. Notable users of Gold's Gym have included such celebrities as Jessica Alba, Jodie Foster, Morgan Freeman, Dwayne Johnson, Jim Morrison, Keanu Reeves, Hilary Swank, and Tiger Woods, and many others. The original Gold's Gym in Venice Beach is considered a national sports landmark by ESPN and is named on its list of the 100 most important sports venues.

Corporate information 

Gold's Gym is privately owned. It was acquired from its previous owner, private equity firm Brockway Moran & Partners, by Robert Rowling's TRT Holdings in 2004 for approximately $158 million. Brockway Moran had acquired the company in 1999 for more than $50 million. Corporate headquarters are in the Dallas metropolitan area.

Since Gold's Gym opened its first international location in Canada in 1985, the company has expanded its global franchising program to include nearly 180 international gyms including operations in Russia, India, Australia, Costa Rica, Japan, the United Kingdom, Netherlands, Germany, Austria, Egypt, Saudi Arabia, Mexico, Peru, Indonesia, Spain, Poland, Venezuela, Mongolia, the Philippines, and the United Arab Emirates.

There were 58 new Gold's Gym locations developed across the world in 2016.

In 2017, the company opened its first location in Amman, Jordan.

Corporate sales and wellness program 
Gold's Gym operates a national corporate wellness program which has over 3000 company partners including Home Depot, Bank of America, Whataburger, and Union Pacific. The corporate sales and wellness program offers custom health and fitness plans for employees nationwide including memberships, nutrition, and wellness programs.

Gold's is one of two official health clubs of the AARP. Through the AARP it offers month-to-month memberships, and is also the official health club of the Blue Cross and Blue Shield Association. Gold's offers online enrollment.

2020 bankruptcy 
On May 4, 2020, GGI Holdings, LLC (Gold's Gym) and 14 affiliated debtors filed Chapter 11 bankruptcy in the United States District Court for the Northern District of Texas. The debtors have requested joint administration of the cases under Case No. 20-31318. Like nearly all businesses, Gold's was required to temporarily close its US locations in March 2020 amid the COVID-19 pandemic. In April of the same year Gold's said that it would permanently close 30 of its locations. They said their filing for bankruptcy would only affect company-owned locations and set a reemergence goal for August 2020. The company owns about 10 percent of the nearly 700 worldwide locations.

In August 2020, Gold's was acquired by Rainer Schallers  RSG Group GmbH, which also owns the European McFit fitness chain.

Current operations 
Gold's Gym has locations across six continents. In 2015 and 2016, Gold's Gym topped the J.D. Power Health and Fitness Center Satisfaction Report.

In 2017, Gold's Gym launched GOLD'S AMP, a fitness app that is meant to serve as a digital personal trainer for people to use anytime and anywhere. It includes numerous customization workout options led by Gold's Gym coaches and thousands of music mixes.

In July 2020, new parent company RSG Group reported that Gold's Gym had 61 company-owned gyms and over 600 franchise-owned gyms.

Gold's Gym Challenge 
Gold's Gym holds an annual Gold's Gym Challenge, a 12-week body transformation contest available to members. In January, participants begin their Challenge journey with initial measurements and photographs. After twelve weeks additional measurements and photographs are taken to document results. Each participating Gold's Gym chooses its local winners who are then eligible for the national prize pool.

Gold's Gym Challenge winners have been featured in many publications including PopSugar, Atlanta Journal-Constitution, and Women's Health.

Criticism 
Numerous customers have reported that Gold's Gym franchises have acted in dishonest and unscrupulous ways. They cite advertised deals not being honored, billing irregularities, contract terms being fraudulently altered by sales staff after signing, and problems canceling accounts or relocating. A Gold's Gym in Provo, Utah was successfully sued for fraud in 2006, for changing a contract after it was signed in 1999.

An accusation of the same conduct of fraud arose again in 2017: on February 10, 2017, the billing processor for the gyms, Paramount Acceptance, and 26 companies under the VASA Fitness name (including new gyms since 2014) were served with a consumer class action lawsuit with numerous causes of action including fraudulent misrepresentation, violations of the Telephone Consumer Protection Act, and violations of the Utah Consumer Sales Practices Act. The plaintiff published the entire complaint.

After ten years of litigation involving a licensing agreement for a fitness center in St. George, the Utah Supreme Court affirmed a decision to deny attorney fees to Gold's Gym even though Gold's Gym prevailed in the underlying litigation (Gold's Gym International, Inc. v. Chambers, 2020 UT 20).

References

External links 

 
 GOLD'S AMP

Health clubs in the United States
Franchises
American companies established in 1965
Health care companies established in 1965
1965 establishments in California
History of Los Angeles
Venice, Los Angeles
Companies based in Dallas
Privately held companies based in Texas
Exercise-related trademarks
Companies that filed for Chapter 11 bankruptcy in 2020